Shocklach Oviatt is a former civil parish, now in the parish of Shocklach Oviatt and District, in the unitary authority of Cheshire West and Chester and the ceremonial county of Cheshire, England. The parish of Shocklach comprised the townships Shocklach Oviatt, Church Shocklach and Caldecott. The civil parish was abolished in 2015 to form Shocklach Oviatt and District.

Shocklach Oviatt is located approximately 16 kilometres from the border between Wales and England. Set beside the tributary of the River Dee between Wrexham (16 kilometres away) and Nantwich. The River Dee meanders alongside Shocklach Oviatt and is a major salmon and sea trout fishery; and one in which Shocklach fishery engages in. Salmon are most often caught in the sections lying between Shocklach up to Bala Lake.

Demographics

In the 1870s, Shocklach was described as being "on River Dee, 4½ miles N W. of Malpas, 2957 ac., pop. 325; the par. contains the townships of Shocklach Church, 1278 ac., pop. 135, and Shocklach Oviatt, 1848 ac., pop. 135".

Shocklach had a population of 290 according to the 2011 census.
Data from the Vision of Britain website shows the total number of houses in Shocklach Oviatt parish from 1881 to 1961.

History

Firstly, there is history behind the name of the village. According to the Concise Oxford Dictionary of English Place Names, the village name Shocklach means 'goblin stream'. Investigating this meaning further, the old English (according to the Oxford English Dictionary) for goblin "was scucca and lache which is a variant of letch which means wet ditch or bog or a stream flowing through boggy land; a muddy, ditch or hole". Similarly there is a village named Shobrooke in Devon, and the dictionary compares the original meaning of this name (goblin brook) with that of the village Shocklach.

Parish history

The village of Shocklach has two townships in Wrexham district, and a parish partly also in Great Boughton district, and all in Cheshire. The townships are Church Shocklach and Shocklach Oviatt. Shocklach Oviatt was a township in Shocklach ancient parish, Broxton hundred, which became a civil parish in 1866. It includes the hamlets of Lane End, Little Green and Shocklach Green.

Parish Council

Shocklach Oviatt and District Parish Council covers the parishes of Shocklach Oviatt, Shocklach Church, Caldecott and Horton. Meetings take place in Shocklach Oviatt Primary School on the second Thursday of six months of the year. Everyone in the public is welcome to attend the parish meetings, where guest speakers are invited to talk about issues of local interest.

Occupational structure
Using information provided by the Vision of Britain website, we are able to see the history of the social structure of Shocklach village in the nineteenth century. In 1831, the largest occupational status was 'labourers and servants' (70 people), followed by 'employees and professionals' (22 people), the next 'middling sorts' (20 people) and the lowest status was a category of 'other' (3 people).

Furthermore, data from 1881 gives us a much more detailed picture of the occupational structure of Shocklach Oviatt. There are nine categories of occupation; domestic services or offices, agriculture, workers in machines and implements, workers in carriages and harnesses, workers in food and lodging, workers in dress, workers in general or unspecified commodities, persons without specified occupations and the last category being unknown occupation. Many of these categories combine 'Workers and Dealers' in different commodities, so it is impossible to distinguish workers in manufacturing and services.

Amenities

St Edith's Church

Some buildings are regarded as historical. In 'The Buildings of England, Cheshire', St Edith's Church appears to represent the main building for the village. It is described "a small Normal building- cf. the very crudely decorated doorway with zigzag, rope, and lozenges broken by ninety degrees. Nave and chancel, and double bellcote... the odd w baptistery squeezed between the two buttresses looks a rustic job".

Today, standing in the middle of fields on its own, overlooking the River Dee and Wales, St Edith's Church still remains an important building. It is a Grade I listed building and a small, isolated 12th-century church situated one mile outside the village of Shocklach. The church has a beautiful Norman doorway but the level of the ground outside is higher than the base of the door.

Shocklach Oviatt CE Primary School

Shocklach Oviatt CE Primary School has achieved an International Award for Outstanding Development of the International Dimension. A report (October 2010) states that an Outreach Children's Centre opened inside the primary school on 13 October 2010 which can serve children and families of neighbouring schools and surrounding villages. The aim of the Centre was to support and improve the lives of young children and families from a wide area, also seen as a celebration of rural partnership working.

John Stephens, Director of Children and Young People's Services officially opened the Centre. He said "it has strong support from the whole community who have been involved from the outset, and it provides much needed provision within our rural areas." "The Centre will add to our already thriving community and forge even stronger links between our three schools in the future."

Biodiversity and the environment

Shocklach Oviatt has a range of biodiversity that the village takes pride in. The 'Shocklach Oak' is "a wonderful tree which has a girth of 6.5 metres and has been recorder with the Woodland Trust in their Ancient Tree Record". The tree is still healthy and continues to grow strong. The Shocklach village website provides a biodiversity survey, recording a diverse range of 138 species of flora (plant life) and 303 species of fauna (animal life).

Furthermore, it shows to have connections and interests in biodiversity. Interests include being a Site of Biological Importance (SBI), a Site and an Area of Nature Conservation Value(SNCV and ANCV respectively) and lastly a Site of Special Scientific Interest (SSSI). Shocklach churchyard and meadows are a Grade B Site of Biological Importance and a Site of Nature Conservation value.

Shocklach Oviatt still remains active in helping the environment. In 2012, tree Warden Martin Green and some of Shocklach's residents, planted 300 native trees in and around Shocklach. For the Queen's Diamond Jubilee, 50 native oak trees were planted at Shocklach Oviatt Primary School, St Edith's church and also along the approach road to Shocklach in which half survived and just before Christmas, 26 trees were replaced with strong, new saplings.

See also

Listed buildings in Shocklach Oviatt

References

External links

Former civil parishes in Cheshire
Cheshire West and Chester